Yap Women's Association is a women's rights organisation in Yap State, in the Federated States of Micronesia. Founded in 1955 as a non-profit it works to provide resources for women in the state.

Background 
The YAP Women's Association was founded in 1955 as a non-profit initiative to represent the women's groups in Yap State. One of its founders was nurse and activist Anna Falgog, who brought together women who worked in government to set up a women's group.

Programmes 
The YWA acts as an intermediary between the national government and local groups. As reported in 1992, the YWA could provide catering and dancers for events targeted at tourists. In 1995 the YWA supported the Pacific Islands Association of Libraries and Archives Conference, represented by Laura Tiningdad. As of 2001, a member of the YWA served each year on the Yap Day committee. In 2009 the association supported the creation of the Neighboring Islands Women Association, to deliver services for the outer islands surrounding Yap, led by Irene Futumai.

As of 2013, seventy-three groups were registered with the association. In 2017 the Chinese government gave the association a grant of $120,000 to fund the construction of new building. Between 2015 and 2019, murdered assistant attorney general, Rachelle Bergeron, worked closely with and updated the bye-laws of the YWA. In 2018 the YWA hosted Baklai Temengil and Jennifer Chieng in the run up to the 2018 MicroGames.

As of 2020, the President of the YWA was Laura Ngaden. In 2013 she was the State Electoral Commissioner.

References 

Women's rights organizations
Organizations based in the Federated States of Micronesia